Shri Nageshwar Parshwanath Tirth or Shri Jain Shwetamber Nageshwar Parshwanath Tirth Pedhi is a Jain Temple situated in Unhel, Jhalawar district, Rajasthan. This temple is dedicated to Parshvanatha, the 23rd Tirthankar.

About Temple
The temple is situated on the border of Madhya Pradesh and Rajasthan State. The ancient name of this tirth is Virampur. This ancient temple was around 1200–1300 years ago. The temple was renovated in 1207(V.S. 1264) by Jain Acharya Shri Abhay Devsuri. The temple belongs to Shwetamber sect. of Jainism. This temple is made by white marble and is considered very miraculous.
There is provision for accommodation with all modern facilities in the temple and bhojanlya.
The temple also manages a goushala knowns as Shri Nageshwar Parshwantha Goushala.

Main Idol
Moolnayak of this temple is a 13½ feet tall green colored idol of Parshwanath in Kayotsarga with hood of 7 cobra carved from a single emerald stone. The idol is believed to be around 2850 years old and said to crafted by Dharnendra himself. It is believed that the idol is of the same height as Parshvanath in real. The idol also has fine carvings of lotus leaves, dear, lion, dharamchakra etc. According to folklore this idol was earlier made up of gold and was later converted to stone by Dharnendra on advice of a Jain acharya to protect it from being stolen. The idol is also known as 'Nagababa'. 4 feet tall idols of Lord Shri Shantinath Swami and Lord Shri Mahavir Swami are present on either sides of main idol. It is said that behind 7 hoods of the snake spread over the idol's head is a hole which houses a snake and The snake is rarely seen coming out from its hole.
Inside the main temple there are 24 Jinalayas, with statues of 24 four tirthankars are duly seated. Idols of Shri Simandhar Swami, Shri Padmavatidevi and Shri Mani Bhadra Veer are also present in the temple.

External links
Main Idol
Main Temple

References

Jain temples in Rajasthan